The Marietta Johnson School of Organic Education was a school founded by Marietta Johnson.

The School of Organic Education facility was listed on the National Register of Historic Places in 1988.

The listing included three contributing buildings: the Bell Building built and expanded in 1904 and 1910;  Dahlgren Hall, built in 1912; and the Art Barn, built in 1924.

The school was profiled by educator John Dewey in his 1913 book Schools of Tomorrow.

References

National Register of Historic Places in Alabama
School buildings completed in 1904
Baldwin County, Alabama
Schools in Alabama
1904 establishments in Alabama